Kapinos is a surname of Ukrainian and Polish origin. Notable people with the surname include:

 Jeremy Kapinos (born 1984), former American football player
 Tom Kapinos (born 1969), American television writer and screenwriter

References

Polish-language surnames
Ukrainian-language surnames